Plowman is an occupational surname based on plowman, the user of a plow. Notable people with the surname include:

 Anna-Louise Plowman (born c. 1972), New Zealand actress
 Arthur J. Plowman (1872-1942), American politician
 Sir Anthony Plowman (1905–1993) Vice-Chancellor of the High Court
 Clifford Henry Fitzherbert Plowman (1889-1948),  British diplomat and Colonial Service administrator
 Idora Plowman (1843 - 1929), American author
 Jacob H. Plowman (1836–1897), American politician
 Jon Plowman (born 1953), British television producer
 Jonathan Plowman Jr. (1717–1795), American revolutionary
 Lynne Plowman is a contemporary British composer
Mark Plowman (The Messengers), fictional character
 Max Plowman (1883–1941), British writer and pacifist
 Thomas S. Plowman (1843–1919), American politician
 Timothy Plowman (1944–1989), American botanist
 Tony Plowman (born 1939), Australian politician
Vincent Plowman, fictional character

Occupational surnames
English-language occupational surnames